Francisco Ortega (died 1602) was a Roman Catholic prelate who served as Bishop of Nueva Caceres (1599–1602).

Biography
Francisco Ortega was ordained a priest in the Order of Saint Augustine. On 13 September 1599, he was appointed during the papacy of Pope Clement VIII as Bishop of Nueva Caceres. In 1600, he was consecrated bishop. He served as Bishop of Nueva Caceres until his death in 1602.

References

External links and additional sources
 (for Chronology of Bishops) 
 (for Chronology of Bishops) 

17th-century Roman Catholic bishops in the Philippines
Bishops appointed by Pope Clement VIII
1602 deaths
Augustinian bishops